Independence High School is a consolidated high school in rural Raleigh County, West Virginia, located in the town of Coal City, West Virginia. The names of Independence and its sister school and rival Liberty High School reflect the fact they were both built in 1976, the U.S. Bicentennial. Independence consolidated the former Stoco and Sophia high schools and currently has over 500 students. The school nickname is Patriots and its colors are red, white, and blue.

Independence has received the Jennings Randolph Award several times.  The award is given annually by the Secretary of State of West Virginia to dozens of high schools in the state that have registered 85 to 100 percent of eligible members of their senior class to vote.

Independence is also home to five wrestling state championships and one baseball championship.

References

External links
 Independence High School

Public high schools in West Virginia
Buildings and structures in Raleigh County, West Virginia
Education in Raleigh County, West Virginia